The Nimbin Rocks are volcanic extrusions of rhyolite left over from the Mount Warning Tweed Volcano that erupted around 20 million years ago in what is now northern New South Wales, Australia.

As part of an eroded dyke of the volcano, the Rocks are situated just outside the present day caldera wall about 20 km from Mount Warning and three kilometres from Nimbin village. The three most prominent are known as the Thimble, Cathedral and Needle. They are an extremely significant cultural site to the local Bundjalung tribe of Aboriginal people who believe the rocks were home to the Nmbngee, or Clever Men. They were also initiation grounds for young boys and the dreaming story can be read at the Nimbin Museum.

Gallery

References

External links
 Northern Rivers Geology Blog - Nimbin Rocks!?

Northern Rivers
Tourist attractions in New South Wales
Rock formations of Australia